Ali Abdollahi Aliabadi is an Iranian senior military officer and politician who is currently coordinator deputy of General Staff of Armed Forces of the Islamic Republic of Iran. He served as governor and vice minister during presidency of Mahmoud Ahmadinejad.

Military career 
Offices held by general Abdollahi include:
 Commander, Gilan Quds Provincial Corps
 Commander of Headquarters, Revolutionary Guards Ground Force
 Head of Inspection Circle, Revolutionary Guards Joint Staff
 Second-in-Command, Revolutionary Guards Air Force
 Deputy for Coordination, Law Enforcement Force
 Second-in-Command, Law Enforcement Force (until 2005)
 Caretaker, Law Enforcement Force (2005)
 Deputy for Readiness, Logistics and Industrial Research, General Staff of Armed Forces (2013–2016)
 Deputy for Coordination, General Staff of Armed Forces (2016–)

References

Living people
Chief commanders of Law Enforcement Force of Islamic Republic of Iran
Iranian governors
People from Gilan Province
1959 births
Islamic Revolutionary Guard Corps personnel of the Iran–Iraq War
Islamic Revolutionary Guard Corps brigadier generals
Iranian individuals subject to the U.S. Department of the Treasury sanctions